Acacia hendersonii is a shrub belonging to the genus Acacia and the subgenus Phyllodineae that is native to parts of north eastern Australia.

Description
It has slender, prominently ribbed branchlets. Like most species of Acacia it has phyllodes rather than true leaves. When it blooms it produced simple inflorescences occur singly in the axils and have spherical flower-heads containing 30 to 35 yellow coloured flowers.

Taxonomy
The species was first formally described by the botanist Leslie Pedley in 1999 as part of the work Notes on Acacia (Leguminosae: Mimosoideae) chiefly from northern Australia as published in the journal Austrobaileya.

Distribution
The shrub has a limited distribution on the Blackdown tableland area of the Central Highlands Region of Queensland where it is found on sandstone plateaus growing in skeletal sandy soils among Eucalyptus and Acacia woodland communities.

See also
 List of Acacia species

References

hendersonii
Flora of Queensland
Plants described in 1999
Taxa named by Leslie Pedley